Rhythm & News was a Christian a cappella vocal group formed in the late 1980s in Vancouver, British Columbia, Canada. During the 1990s, the group gained success in Canada and parts of the United States in the gospel music industry. Their a cappella style with beatbox beats, hip hop and rap became known as "funkappella" throughout their fan base.

History
Rhythm & News was started in 1988 by four high school friends in Vancouver, British Columbia named Doug Zimmerman, Mark Batten, Brad Strelau, and Kevin Pollard. Their aspirations to be a Christian a cappella band started in Brad's basement singing along to a boom box. Soon, the guys were sporadically touring across Canada. With the release of their first album, “Get With the Rhythm,” Rhythm and News was introduced to the rest of Canada with their original “funkappella” style. The height of their success came in 1992, when they released their second studio album, “Word 2 Y'all,” which became one of the top selling albums in Canada by a Canadian gospel artist. In 1994, the group temporarily moved to Detroit, MI for a few months to record their 3rd and last album, "Dream Love + Pray" with gospel great Fred Hammond.

Later in 1994, original members Doug and Kevin left the group and were replaced with Todd Wickens and Spencer Welch.  The transition produced a departure from their a cappella beats to live instruments. The band continued to tour across North America and parts of South America until disbanding in 1998.

Through the group's Facebook page, the guys have expressed that they have had discussions of possibly reuniting to record in the studio.

Members
Doug Zimmermann (1988-1994)
Kevin Pollard (1988-1994) 
Mark Batten (1988-1998)
Brad Strelau (1988-1998)
Spencer Welch (1994-1998)
Todd Wickens (1994-1998)

Discography

Get With the Rhythm (1990)
Word 2 Y'all (1992)
Dream Love + Pray (1994)

Songs on Compilations
''GMA Canada Presents 30th Anniversary Collection, "Get With the Rhythm" (CMC, 2008)

Awards

Gospel Music Association of Canada 30th Annual Covenant Awards

2008 Lifetime Achievement Award

References

Musical groups from Vancouver
A cappella musical groups
Canadian gospel music groups
Musical groups established in 1988
1988 establishments in British Columbia